Tarbiat Library is the first state library constructed in Iran, established in 1921 at Tabriz. The library was founded by Mahammad Ali Tarbiat, an Iranian journalist and politician, as the "Ma'aref public library and reading room" which was later renamed after its founder to Tarbiat Library.

References 

Libraries in Iran
Education in Tabriz
Libraries established in 1921
1921 establishments in Iran
Buildings and structures in Tabriz